2021 British shadow cabinet reshuffle may refer to:

 May 2021 British shadow cabinet reshuffle
 November 2021 British shadow cabinet reshuffle